Philippe Paolantoni (born 1952) is a French civil servant and administrator. Paolantoni was appointed the French Administrator Superior of Wallis and Futuna on Monday 28 July 2008, succeeding his predecessor Richard Didier. He officially took office in Wallis and Futuna on 8 September 2008.

Paolantoni served as the Vice-Prefect of the city of Brest, France, in the region of Brittany, for the three years prior to being named the Administrator Superior of Wallis and Futuna.

See also 
 Politics of Wallis and Futuna

References

External links 
 World Statesman: Wallis and Futuna

1952 births
Administrator Superiors of Wallis and Futuna
French civil servants
French politicians
People from Brest, France
Living people